Barry Friend (born 13 October 1951) is an English former professional footballer who played in the Football League for Fulham. He also played non-league football in the London area for clubs including Leatherhead, Wimbledon, with whom he won the Southern League title in 1977, Slough Town, Carshalton Athletic and Tooting & Mitcham United. He played as a winger or midfielder. In the summer of 1976, he played abroad in Canada's National Soccer League with Ottawa Tigers.

References

1951 births
Living people
Footballers from Wandsworth
English footballers
Association football wingers
Fulham F.C. players
Leatherhead F.C. players
Wimbledon F.C. players
Tooting & Mitcham United F.C. players
Slough Town F.C. players
Carshalton Athletic F.C. players
English Football League players
Southern Football League players
Isthmian League players
Canadian National Soccer League players